The Live Adventures of Mike Bloomfield and Al Kooper is a double album recorded at the Fillmore West venue; the album is a successor to the studio album Super Session, which included Stephen Stills in addition to Bloomfield and Kooper, and had achieved commercial and critical success earlier in 1968.

The performances, recordings and production cannot be described as flawless; in his sleeve notes, Kooper describes the difficulties of finding rehearsal space, Bloomfield's insomnia, and the failure of a vocal microphone during "Dear Mr Fantasy"; the track  "I Wonder Who" is faded during a Bloomfield solo for no apparent reason.

Nevertheless, the album remains an important, if raw, document of a live blues-rock performance of the period and, apart from its intrinsic qualities, is notable not only for one of the earliest live recordings by Carlos Santana but also for Bloomfield's debut as a vocalist. Whilst he is not historically noted in this role, in "Don't Throw Your Love on Me So Strong", according to Kooper, "he displays consummate homage to the traditional guitar-voice trade-offs; a lesson in phrasing and understanding." (?)

Live Adventures has since been re-released on CD but without any additional material beyond its initial release; the concerts took place over three nights, and according to Kooper, for two sets a night; this should have yielded several hours of recordings, of which the album provides just short of ninety minutes.

Track listing

Side One
"Opening Speech" (Mike Bloomfield) – 1:30
"One-two..Uh, listen here now, here's what...here's where it's at, this is the thing of this gig and here's...I'll tell ya 'bout it now. Uh, awhile ago my friend Alan Kooper called me on the phone and said "Let's make this gig, an LP in Los Angeles, and we'll jam together and we'll see what will happen. . ."
"The 59th Street Bridge Song (Feelin' Groovy)" (Paul Simon) – 5:38
"I Wonder Who" (Ray Charles) – 6:04
"Her Holy Modal Highness" (Al Kooper, Mike Bloomfield) – 9:08

Side Two
"The Weight" (Robbie Robertson) – 4:00
"Mary Ann" (Ray Charles) – 5:19
"Together 'Til the End of Time" (Frank Wilson) – 4:15
"That's All Right" (Arthur Crudup) – 3:28
"Green Onions" (Booker T. Jones, Steve Cropper, Al Jackson Jr., Lewie Steinberg) – 5:26

Side Three
"Opening Speech" (Al Kooper) – 1:28
"Sonny Boy Williamson" (Jack Bruce, Paul Jones) – 6:04
"No More Lonely Nights" (Sonny Boy Williamson I) – 12:27

Side Four
"Dear Mr. Fantasy" (Jim Capaldi, Stevie Winwood, Chris Wood) – 8:04
"Don't Throw Your Love on Me So Strong" (Albert King) – 10:56
"Finale-Refugee" (Al Kooper, Mike Bloomfield) – 2:04

Album cover
The gatefold sleeve features
on the front cover, a painting of Bloomfield and Kooper by Norman Rockwell.
on the rear cover, against a background of a montage of crowd scenes (not necessarily from the concert audience), superimposed photographs of the core band and a track listing.
on the interior, a more detailed track listing, text of Bloomfield's opening speech, and notes by  Kooper, as well as other album credits.
According to Kooper, Rockwell's original artwork ended up on the wall of CBS Art Director, John Berg, who later sold it despite Kooper having expressed an interest in having the painting.

Personnel
Al Kooper – organ, ondioline, piano (overdub as Roosevelt Gook on "Together 'Til the End of Time") and lead vocals
Mike Bloomfield – guitar and vocals
John Kahn – bass
Skip Prokop – drums
Carlos Santana – guitar on "Sonny Boy Williamson"
Elvin Bishop – guitar and lead vocal on "No More Lonely Nights"
Steve Miller and Dave Brown had also volunteered their services. Kooper says (in his book Backstage Passes & Backstabbing Bastards) that Santana, Bishop and Miller performed on three or four songs each. He says Miller "played great", but does not appear on the album because Capitol Records would not give permission.

References

Al Kooper albums
Mike Bloomfield albums
Albums recorded at the Fillmore
1968 live albums
Columbia Records live albums
CBS Records live albums
Sony Records live albums
Albums with cover art by Norman Rockwell
Collaborative albums